Romeu António Soares de Almeida (born 8 October 1974), known simply as Romeu, is a Portuguese former footballer who played as a striker.

Club career
Romeu was born in Feira (Santa Maria da Feira). Over the course of nine seasons, he amassed Primeira Liga totals of 184 games and 31 goals, mainly with C.S. Marítimo (two years) and Vitória de Guimarães (four). In 2002–03, he scored a career-best ten goals in 29 matches as the latter team finished fourth and nearly qualified to the UEFA Cup.

Romeu, who also unsuccessfully represented FC Porto for two seasons, retired in June 2006 at the age of 31 after a poor campaign with C.F. Os Belenenses, both individually (two goals) and collectively (15th place for the Lisbon club).

International career
Courtesy of his stellar year with Guimarães, Romeu earned two caps for Portugal in October 2002: on the 16th, in his last appearance, he helped the national team come from behind 0–2 in Sweden to win it 3–2, netting the equaliser in the 53rd minute.

|}

Honours
Porto
Taça de Portugal: 1999–2000, 2000–01
Supertaça Cândido de Oliveira: 1999

References

External links

1974 births
Living people
Sportspeople from Santa Maria da Feira
Portuguese footballers
Association football forwards
Primeira Liga players
Liga Portugal 2 players
Segunda Divisão players
FC Porto players
F.C. Felgueiras players
C.S. Marítimo players
Leça F.C. players
Vitória S.C. players
C.F. Os Belenenses players
Portugal international footballers